List of snakes refers to a variety of different articles and different criteria. these are listed below.

Lists

General lists
General lists:
 Snake#Taxonomy
List of reptile genera#Order Squamata
List of snakes by common name
List of snakes by scientific name

Lists by special criteria
 Lists by genus:
List of pythonid species and subspecies
List of Serpentes families
List of viperine species and subspecies
By other characteristics:
List of dangerous snakes
List of largest snakes
By region:
List of snakes of Jordan
List of snakes in North Macedonia
Snakes of Nigeria
List of snakes of Spain
List of snakes of Trinidad and Tobago
:Category:Lists of snakes of the United States (lists by U.S. state)

See also
Reptiles
Snakes
Taxonomy